The Stockholm municipal election of 1988 was held on 18 September 1988 concurrently with the 1988 Swedish parliamentary election.  This election used a party-list proportional representation system to allocate the 101 seats of the Stockholm City Council (Stockholms stadsfullmäktige) amongst the various Swedish political parties.  Voter turnout was 81.4%.

The Swedish Centre Party returned to the Stockholm City Council this year after dismal results in 1985 deprived them of a mandate.

This election is the fourth in which the Stockholm Party succeeded in winning seats on the Stockholm City Council.  It marks the high-water mark of the Stockholm Party's electoral success.

Results

See also
 Elections in Sweden
 List of political parties in Sweden
 City of Stockholm

Notes

References
Statistics Sweden, "Kommunfullmäktigval - valresultat" (Swedish) 
Statistics Sweden, "Kommunfullmäktigval - erhållna mandat efter kommun och parti. Valår 1973–2006" (Swedish) 

Municipal elections in Stockholm
1988 elections in Sweden
1980s in Stockholm
September 1988 events in Europe